Valeriy Kinashenko (born 4 February 1964 in Uman) is a retired Ukrainian football forward who last played for FC Nerafa Slavutych.

Since 2003 Kinashenko works at the Dynamo Football Academy.

References

External links
 
Profile at Belarus Football Association.
 30 year ago. Kiev region football federation. 2013.

1964 births
Living people
People from Uman
Soviet footballers
Ukrainian footballers
Association football forwards
Ukrainian expatriate footballers
Expatriate footballers in Belarus
FC Ros Bila Tserkva players
FC Desna Chernihiv players
FC Karpaty Mukacheve players
FC Nyva Myronivka players
FC Torpedo Mogilev players
FC Slavutych players
Sportspeople from Cherkasy Oblast